Toivo Edvard Kujala (18 November 1894, Sippola – 7 April 1959) was a Finnish electrician and politician. In 1918 he was imprisoned for having sided with the Reds during the Finnish Civil War. In the 1920s he became an organiser for the then illegal Communist Party of Finland (SKP), which led to a second prison sentence in 1931. He was imprisoned for a third time during World War II and freed in 1944 after the Communist Party was legalised as a result of the Moscow Armistice of 19 September 1944. He was subsequently elected to the Parliament of Finland, where he represented the Finnish People's Democratic League (SKDL) from 1945 until his death in 1959. Kujala was a member of the Central Committee of the SKP.

References

1894 births
1959 deaths
People from Kouvola
People from Viipuri Province (Grand Duchy of Finland)
Communist Party of Finland politicians
Finnish People's Democratic League politicians
Members of the Parliament of Finland (1945–48)
Members of the Parliament of Finland (1948–51)
Members of the Parliament of Finland (1951–54)
Members of the Parliament of Finland (1954–58)
Members of the Parliament of Finland (1958–62)
People of the Finnish Civil War (Red side)
Finnish people of World War II
Prisoners and detainees of Finland